Majid Beshkar (born ) is a retired Iranian professional footballer. He is best known for his contributions towards the Indian football clubs SC East Bengal and Mohammedan SC, both based in the city of Kolkata, West Bengal. He was popularly known as "Badshah" in Calcutta Maidan. An attacking midfielder, Bishkar also played as a forward in a 4–2–4 formation, and guided SC East Bengal to win the Indian Federation Cup in 1980. He represented the Iranian national football team at the 1978 FIFA World Cup in Argentina.

Earlier career
At club level, Majid began his career in his hometown of Khorramshahr with Rastakhiz FC and then moved to the Tehran Province League with Shahin Tehran FC as a forward, where he played until 1979.

Career in India
During the 1970s he moved to Aligarh Muslim University in India to study. On seeing his performance for the university in the North Zone Inter University championship, Bishkar was signed by East Bengal FC along with other Iranian players Jamshid Nassiri and Mahmud Khabbasi. The 1980 Federation Cup was his debut tournament with the Red and Golds, where he won the tournament with the them. In the same season, East Bengal also won the Rovers Cup where he played a key role.

East Bengal signed him shortly afterwards. He was known as Majid Baskar in India, a mispronunciation and misspelling which led to difficulties for both Iranian and Indian officials in unveiling the true identity of Majid.

Bishkar played imaginative football throughout and was primarily instrumental in East Bengal's winning the IFA Shield (joint winners) and Darjeeling Gold Cup. In the Shield final, he set up CB Thapa to score a magnificent goal after playing four wall-passes with others. At the Darjeeling Gold Cup too, he was unstoppable and was the main prop behind the Red and Golds 3–2 triumph over Mohun Bagan. Overall, Bishkar netted 33 goals for the Red and Gold brigade.

He switched to Mohammedan Sporting Club Kolkata in 1982, guiding them to a range of trophies including Calcutta Football League and Rovers Cup.

Majid was instrumental for the first win against Mohun Bagan AC in 1983 Federation Cup also helping to lift the trophy in the final. This win came after late sixties in any form of tournament. After a brief hiatus at a time when he was surrounded by controversies, he was last seen playing for Mohammedan SC in 1987. He was relatively unknown in Iran, with both Iranian football journalists and officials being unaware that Majid had previously plied his trade in India. Due to troubles in his homeland, he eventually got addicted to narcotics and led a bohemian lifestyle. After a few other unsuccessful stints in other parts of India, he moved back to Iran. He is still considered one of the best foreigners in the history of Indian club football. He has a nickname "Badshah" which he got while playing in Kolkata Maidan.

Bishkar cast a magical spell during two seasons at East Bengal and then at Mohammedan Sporting, but as he returned to Kolkata in 2019, after more than three decades, nobody had forgotten the Badshah.

International career
Bishkar was included in the Iran national football team for the 1978 FIFA World Cup. Iran made its debut World Cup appearance after defeating Australia in Tehran. Iran lost two of three group stage matches against the Netherlands and Peru, and Iran's journey ended early for the group stages.

Personal life
After his brief stint with two Kolkata giants, Bishkar moved to Iran in the 1980s and currently live in Khorramshahr, Khuzestan Province, with his family. On 1 October 2020, he was admitted to a hospital after a heart attack.

Honours
East Bengal
Federation Cup: 1980
Rovers Cup: 1980

Mohammedan Sporting
Federation Cup: 1983–84, 1984–85
IFA Shield: runner-up: 1982
Rovers Cup: 1984; runner-up: 1982, 1983
Sait Nagjee Trophy: 1984
Bordoloi Trophy: 1985; runner-up: 1983
DCM Trophy: runner-up: 1982, 1983
Darjeeling Gold Cup: 1984

Individual
 East Bengal "Best Foreign Player Award": 2019

See also
1978 FIFA World Cup squads
List of foreign players for SC East Bengal

References

Further reading

Chatterjee, Partha. The Nation and Its Fragments: Colonial and Post-colonial Histories (Calcutta: Oxford University Press, 1995).

External links

Planet World Cup
Stats at RSSSF

1956 births
Living people
Iranian footballers
1978 FIFA World Cup players
Iran international footballers
Iranian expatriate footballers
East Bengal Club players
People from Khorramshahr
Association football midfielders
Expatriate footballers in India
Iranian expatriate sportspeople in India
Calcutta Football League players
Sportspeople from Khuzestan province
20th-century Iranian people